Scammell is a British truck manufacturer.

Scammel or Scammell may also refer to:


People
 Scammell (surname)
 Walter Scammel (died 1286), Bishop of Salisbury
 Arthur Scammell

United States Revenue Service vessels
 , a revenue cutter in service from 1791 to 1798
 , a 14-gun schooner commissioned in 1798

Other uses
 Fort Scammell, House Island, Maine, United States
 Laurence, Laura and Honor Scammel, characters in New Street Law, a British television series

See also
 Scammell's 1781 Light Infantry Regiment, an American Continental Army unit in 1781